The 1916 Copa del Rey Final was the 16th final of the Spanish cup competition, the Copa del Rey. The final was played at Camp de la Indústria in Barcelona on 7 May 1916. The match was won by Athletic Bilbao, who beat Madrid FC 4–0. The star of the match was Félix Zubizarreta, who scored a hat-trick to help Bilbao to a 4-0 win. He become only the second player to score a hat-trick in the final after teammate Pichichi, who had done it in the previous final against Espanyol.

Details

|}

See also
El Viejo Clásico

References

External links
linguasport.com
RSSSF.com

1916
1915–16 in Spanish football
Athletic Bilbao matches
Real Madrid CF matches